Hunter Stockton Thompson (July 18, 1937 – February 20, 2005) was an American journalist and author who founded the gonzo journalism movement. He rose to prominence with the publication of Hell's Angels (1967), a book for which he spent a year living and riding with the Hells Angels motorcycle club to write a first-hand account of their lives and experiences.

In 1970, he wrote an unconventional magazine feature titled "The Kentucky Derby Is Decadent and Depraved" for Scanlan's Monthly, which raised his profile and established his counterculture credibility. It also set him on the path to establishing his own subgenre of New Journalism that he called "Gonzo", a journalistic style in which the writer becomes a central figure and participant in the events of the narrative.

Thompson remains best known for Fear and Loathing in Las Vegas (1971), a book first serialized in Rolling Stone in which he grapples with the implications of what he considered the failure of the 1960s counterculture movement. It was adapted for film twice: loosely in Where the Buffalo Roam starring Bill Murray as Thompson in 1980, and explicitly in 1998 by director Terry Gilliam in the eponymous film starring Johnny Depp and Benicio del Toro.

Thompson ran unsuccessfully for sheriff of Pitkin County, Colorado, in 1970 on the Freak Power ticket. His campaign was chronicled in the documentary film Freak Power: The Ballot or the Bomb. He became known for his dislike of Richard Nixon, who he claimed represented "that dark, venal, and incurably violent side of the American character". He covered Nixon's 1972 reelection campaign for Rolling Stone and later collected the stories in book form as Fear and Loathing: On the Campaign Trail '72.

Thompson's output declined from the mid-1970s, as he struggled with the consequences of fame, and complained that he could no longer merely report on events, as he was too easily recognized. After several high-profile stories were quashed by the upper management of Rolling Stone, he found it increasingly difficult to get his work into mainstream outlets. He did continue to write for alternative newspapers, and had a gig as a critic for the mainstream San Francisco Examiner for much of the late 1980s and early 1990s. Most of his work from 1979 to 1994 was collected in The Gonzo Papers. He continued to write for various journalism outlets in a variety of formats, including sporadic stories published in Rolling Stone and a weekly column that appeared on ESPN.com's Page 2 titled "Hey, Rube" that he started in 2000.

He was known for his lifelong use of alcohol and illegal narcotics, his love of firearms, and his iconoclastic contempt for authority. He often remarked: "I hate to advocate drugs, alcohol, violence, or insanity to anyone, but they've always worked for me." Thompson died by suicide at the age of 67, following a series of health problems. In accordance with his wishes, his ashes were fired out of a cannon in a ceremony funded by his friend Johnny Depp and attended by friends including then-Senator John Kerry and Jack Nicholson. Hari Kunzru wrote, "The true voice of Thompson is revealed to be that of American moralist ... one who often makes himself ugly to expose the ugliness he sees around him."

Early life
Thompson was born into a middle-class family in Louisville, Kentucky, the first of three sons of Virginia Davison Ray (1908, Springfield, Kentucky – March 20, 1998, Louisville), who worked as head librarian at the Louisville Free Public Library and Jack Robert Thompson (September 4, 1893, Horse Cave, Kentucky – July 3, 1952, Louisville), a public insurance adjuster and World War I veteran. His parents were introduced by a friend from Jack's fraternity at the University of Kentucky in September 1934, and married on November 2, 1935. Journalist Nicholas Lezard of The Guardian stated that Thompson's first name, Hunter, came from an ancestor on his mother's side, the Scottish surgeon John Hunter. A more direct attribution is that Thompson's first and middle name, Hunter Stockton, came from his maternal grandparents, Prestly Stockton Ray and Lucille Hunter.

In December 1943, when Thompson was six years old, the family settled in the affluent Cherokee Triangle neighborhood of The Highlands. On July 3, 1952, when Thompson was 14, his father died of myasthenia gravis at age 58. Hunter and his brothers were raised by their mother. Virginia worked as a librarian to support her children, and was described as a "heavy drinker" following her husband's death.

Education

Interested in sports and athletically inclined from a young age, Thompson co-founded the Hawks Athletic Club while attending I.N. Bloom Elementary School, which led to an invitation to join Louisville's Castlewood Athletic Club for adolescents that prepared them for high-school sports. Ultimately, he never joined a sports team in high school.

Thompson attended I.N. Bloom Elementary School, Highland Middle School, and Atherton High School, before transferring to Louisville Male High School in fall 1952. Also in 1952, he was accepted as a member of the Athenaeum Literary Association, a school-sponsored literary and social club that dated to 1862. Its members at the time came from Louisville's upper-class families, and included Porter Bibb, who became the first publisher of Rolling Stone at Thompson's behest. During this time, Thompson read and admired J. P. Donleavy's The Ginger Man.

As an Athenaeum member, Thompson contributed articles to and helped produce the club's yearbook The Spectator. The group ejected Thompson in 1955 for criminal activity. Charged as an accessory to robbery after being in a car with the perpetrator, Thompson was sentenced to 60 days in Kentucky's Jefferson County Jail. He served 31 days and, a week after his release, enlisted in the United States Air Force. While he was in jail, the school superintendent refused permission to take his high-school final examinations so he was unable to graduate.

Military service

Thompson completed basic training at Lackland Air Force Base in San Antonio, Texas, and transferred to Scott Air Force Base in Belleville, Illinois, to study electronics. He applied to become an aviator, but the Air Force's aviation-cadet program rejected his application. In 1956, he transferred to Eglin Air Force Base near Fort Walton Beach, Florida. While serving at Eglin, he took evening classes at Florida State University. At Eglin, he landed his first professional writing job as sports editor of The Command Courier by falsifying his job experience. As sports editor, Thompson traveled around the United States with the Eglin Eagles football team, covering its games. In early 1957, he wrote a sports column for The Playground News, a local newspaper in Fort Walton Beach, Florida. His name did not appear on the column because Air Force regulations forbade outside employment.

In 1958, while he was an airman first class, his commanding officer recommended him for an early honorable discharge. "In summary, this airman, although talented, will not be guided by policy," chief of information services Colonel William S. Evans wrote to the Eglin personnel office. "Sometimes his rebel and superior attitude seems to rub off on other airmen staff members."

Early journalism career
After leaving the Air Force, Thompson worked as sports editor for a newspaper in Jersey Shore, Pennsylvania, before relocating to New York City. There he audited several courses at the Columbia University School of General Studies. During this time he worked briefly for Time as a copy boy for $51 a week. At work, he typed out parts of F. Scott Fitzgerald's The Great Gatsby and Ernest Hemingway's A Farewell to Arms in order to learn the authors' rhythms and writing styles. In 1959 Time fired him for insubordination. Later that year, he worked as a reporter for The Middletown Daily Record in Middletown, New York. He was fired from this job after damaging an office candy machine and arguing with the owner of a local restaurant who happened to be an advertiser with the paper.

In 1960, Thompson moved to San Juan, Puerto Rico, to take a job with the sporting magazine El Sportivo, which ceased operations soon after his arrival. Thompson applied for a job with the Puerto Rican English-language daily The San Juan Star, but its managing editor, future novelist William J. Kennedy, turned him down. Nonetheless, the two became friends. After the demise of El Sportivo, Thompson worked as a stringer for the New York Herald Tribune and a few other stateside papers on Caribbean issues, with Kennedy working as his editor.

After returning to mainland United States, Thompson visited San Francisco and eventually lived in Big Sur, where he worked as a security guard and caretaker at Slates Hot Springs for an eight-month period in 1961, just before it became the Esalen Institute. At the time, Big Sur was a Beat outpost and home of Henry Miller and Dennis Murphy (screenwriter), both of whom Thompson admired. While there, he published his first magazine feature in Rogue about the artisan and bohemian culture of Big Sur. During this period, Thompson wrote two novels, Prince Jellyfish and The Rum Diary, and submitted many short stories to publishers – with little success. The Rum Diary, based on Thompson's experiences in Puerto Rico, was not published until .

In May 1962, Thompson traveled to South America for a year as a correspondent for the Dow Jones-owned weekly paper, the National Observer. In Brazil, he spent several months as a reporter for the Brazil Herald, the country's only English-language daily, published in Rio de Janeiro. His longtime girlfriend Sandra Dawn Conklin (or Sandy Conklin Thompson, subsequently Sondi Wright) later joined him in Rio. They married on May 19, 1963, shortly after returning to the United States, and lived briefly in Aspen, Colorado. Sandy was eight months pregnant when they relocated to Glen Ellen, California. Their son, Juan Fitzgerald Thompson, was born on March 23, 1964. During the summer of that same year, Hunter began taking Dexedrine, which is what he would predominantly use for writing up until around 1974 when he began to write mostly under the influence of cocaine. 

Thompson continued to write for the National Observer on an array of domestic subjects during the early 60s. One story told of his 1964 visit to Ketchum, Idaho, to investigate the reasons for Ernest Hemingway's suicide. While there, he stole a pair of elk antlers hanging above the front door of Hemingway's cabin. Later that year, Thompson moved to San Francisco, where he attended the 1964 GOP Convention at the Cow Palace. Thompson severed his ties with the Observer after his editor refused to print his review of Tom Wolfe's 1965 essay-collection The Kandy-Kolored Tangerine-Flake Streamline Baby. He later immersed himself in the drug and hippie culture taking root in the area, and soon began writing for the Berkeley underground paper Spider.

Hell's Angels

In 1965 Carey McWilliams, editor of The Nation, hired Thompson to write a story about the Hells Angels motorcycle club in California. At the time Thompson was living in a house near San Francisco's Haight-Ashbury neighborhood, where the Hells Angels lived across from the Grateful Dead. His article appeared on May 17, 1965, after which he received several book offers and spent the next year living and riding with the club. The relationship broke down when the bikers perceived that Thompson was exploiting them for personal gain and demanded a share of his profits. An argument at a party resulted in Thompson suffering a savage beating (or "stomping", as the Angels referred to it). Random House published the hard-cover Hell's Angels: The Strange and Terrible Saga of the Outlaw Motorcycle Gangs in 1966, and the fight between Thompson and the Angels was well-marketed. CBC Television even broadcast an encounter between Thompson and Hells Angel Skip Workman before a live studio audience.

A New York Times review praised the work as an "angry, knowledgeable, fascinating, and excitedly written book", that shows the Hells Angels "not so much as dropouts from society but as total misfits, or unfits—emotionally, intellectually and educationally unfit to achieve the rewards, such as they are, that the contemporary social order offers". The reviewer also praised Thompson as a "spirited, witty, observant, and original writer; his prose crackles like motorcycle exhaust".

Following the book's publication, Thompson appeared as himself on the February 20, 1967, episode of the game show To Tell The Truth, receiving all four votes by the panel members.

Late 1960s
Following the success of Hell's Angels, Thompson successfully sold articles to several national magazines, including The New York Times Magazine, Esquire, Pageant, and Harper's.

In 1967, shortly before the Summer of Love, Thompson wrote "The 'Hashbury' is the Capital of the Hippies" for The New York Times Magazine. He criticized San Francisco's hippies as devoid of both the political convictions of the New Left and the artistic core of the Beats, resulting in a culture overrun with young people who spent their time in the pursuit of drugs. "The thrust is no longer for 'change' or 'progress' or 'revolution', but merely to escape, to live on the far perimeter of a world that might have been – perhaps should have been – and strike a bargain for survival on purely personal terms," he wrote.

By late 1967, Thompson and his family moved back to Colorado and rented a house in Woody Creek, a small mountain hamlet outside Aspen. In early 1969, Thompson received a $15,000 royalty check for the paperback sales of Hell's Angels and used two-thirds of the money for a down payment on a modest home and property where he would live for the rest of his life. He named the house Owl Farm and often described it as his "fortified compound".

In early 1968, Thompson signed the "Writers and Editors War Tax Protest" pledge, vowing to refuse tax payments in protest against the Vietnam War. According to Thompson's letters and his later writings, at this time, he planned to write a book called The Joint Chiefs about "the death of the American Dream." He used a $6,000 advance from Random House to travel the 1968 Presidential campaign trail and attend the 1968 Democratic Convention in Chicago for research. From his hotel room in Chicago, Thompson watched the clashes between police and protesters, which he wrote had a great effect on his political views. The book was never finished, and the theme of the death of the American dream was carried over into his later work. The contract with Random House was eventually fulfilled with the 1972 book Fear and Loathing in Las Vegas. He also signed a deal with Ballantine Books in 1968 to write a satirical book called The Johnson File about Lyndon B. Johnson. A few weeks after the contract was signed, however, Johnson announced that he would not seek re-election, and the deal was canceled.

Middle years

Aspen sheriff campaign

In 1970, Thompson ran for sheriff of Pitkin County, Colorado, as part of a group of citizens running for local offices on the "Freak Power" ticket. The platform included promoting the decriminalization of drugs (for personal use only, not trafficking, as he disapproved of profiteering), tearing up the streets and turning them into grassy pedestrian malls, banning any building so tall as to obscure the view of the mountains, disarming all police forces, and renaming Aspen "Fat City" to deter investors. Thompson, having shaved his head, referred to the crew cut-wearing Republican candidate as "my long-haired opponent".

With polls showing him with a slight lead in a three-way race, Thompson appeared at Rolling Stone magazine headquarters in San Francisco with a six-pack of beer in hand, and declared to editor Jann Wenner that he was about to be elected sheriff of Aspen, Colorado, and wished to write about the "Freak Power" movement. Thus, Thompson's first article in Rolling Stone was published as "The Battle of Aspen" with the byline "By: Dr. Hunter S. Thompson (Candidate for Sheriff)". Despite the publicity, Thompson narrowly lost the election. While carrying the city of Aspen, he garnered only 44% of the county-wide vote in what had become a two-way race. The Republican candidate agreed to withdraw a few days before the election to consolidate the anti-Thompson votes, in return for the Democrats withdrawing their candidate for county commissioner. Thompson later remarked that the Rolling Stone article mobilized his opposition far more than his supporters.

A documentary film about Hunter S. Thompson's campaign for sheriff called Freak Power: The Ballot or the Bomb was released on October 23, 2020.

Birth of Gonzo

Also in 1970, Thompson wrote an article entitled "The Kentucky Derby Is Decadent and Depraved" for the short-lived new journalism magazine Scanlan's Monthly. For that article, editor Warren Hinckle paired Thompson with illustrator Ralph Steadman, who drew expressionist illustrations with lipstick and eyeliner. Thompson's article virtually ignored the race, focusing instead on the drunken revelry surrounding the annual event in his hometown. The first-person narrator also sets that debauchery against a political backdrop, which included the bombing of Cambodia and the deaths of four students at Kent State University, which occurred two days after the Kentucky Derby.

Thompson and Steadman collaborated regularly after that. Although it was not widely read, the article was the first to use the techniques of Gonzo journalism, a style Thompson later employed in almost every literary endeavor. The manic first-person subjectivity of the story was reportedly the result of sheer desperation; he was facing a looming deadline and started sending the magazine pages ripped out of his notebook.

The first use of the word "Gonzo" to describe Thompson's work is credited to the journalist Bill Cardoso, who first met Thompson on a bus full of journalists covering the 1968 New Hampshire primary. In 1970, Cardoso (who was then the editor of The Boston Globe Sunday Magazine) wrote to Thompson praising the "Kentucky Derby" piece as a breakthrough: "This is it, this is pure Gonzo. If this is a start, keep rolling." According to Steadman, Thompson took to the word right away and said, "Okay, that's what I do. Gonzo." Thompson's first published use of the word appears in Fear and Loathing in Las Vegas: "Free Enterprise. The American Dream. Horatio Alger gone mad on drugs in Las Vegas. Do it now: pure Gonzo journalism."

Fear and Loathing in Las Vegas

The book for which Thompson gained most of his fame began during the research for "Strange Rumblings in Aztlan," an exposé for Rolling Stone on the 1970 killing of the Mexican-American television journalist Rubén Salazar. Salazar had been shot in the head at close range with a tear-gas canister fired by officers of the Los Angeles County Sheriff's Department during the National Chicano Moratorium March against the Vietnam War. One of Thompson's sources for the story was Oscar Zeta Acosta, a prominent Mexican-American activist and attorney. Finding it difficult to talk in the racially tense atmosphere of Los Angeles, Thompson and Acosta decided to travel to Las Vegas, and take advantage of an assignment by Sports Illustrated to write a 250-word photograph caption on the Mint 400 motorcycle race held there.

What was to be a short caption quickly grew into something else entirely. Thompson first submitted to Sports Illustrated a manuscript of 2,500 words, which was, as he later wrote, "aggressively rejected." Rolling Stone publisher Jann Wenner was said to have liked "the first 20 or so jangled pages enough to take it seriously on its own terms and tentatively scheduled it for publication — which gave me the push I needed to keep working on it", Thompson later wrote. To develop the story, Thompson and Acosta returned to Las Vegas to attend a drug enforcement conference.

The two trips became the basis for "Fear and Loathing in Las Vegas," which appeared as a two-part Rolling Stone story in November 1971. Random House published the book version the following year. It is written as a first-person account by a journalist named Raoul Duke with Dr. Gonzo, his "300-pound Samoan attorney." During the trip, Duke and his companion (always referred to as "my attorney") become sidetracked by a search for the American Dream, with "two bags of grass, 75 pellets of mescaline, five sheets of high-powered blotter acid, a salt shaker half full of cocaine, and a whole galaxy of multicolored uppers, downers, screamers, laughers ... and also a quart of tequila, a quart of rum, a case of Budweiser, a pint of raw ether, and two dozen amyls."

Coming to terms with the failure of the 1960s countercultural movement is a major theme of the novel, and the book was greeted with considerable critical acclaim, including being heralded by The New York Times as "by far the best book yet written on the decade of dope". "The Vegas Book", as Thompson referred to it, was a mainstream success and introduced his Gonzo journalism techniques to a wide public.

Fear and Loathing on the Campaign Trail '72

Beginning in late 1971, Thompson wrote extensively for Rolling Stone on the election campaigns of President Richard Nixon and his unsuccessful opponent, Senator George McGovern. The articles were soon combined and published as Fear and Loathing on the Campaign Trail '72. As the title suggests, Thompson spent nearly all of his time traveling the "campaign trail", focusing largely on the Democratic Party's primaries. Nixon, as the Republican incumbent, performed little campaign work, while McGovern competed with rival candidates Edmund Muskie and Hubert Humphrey. Thompson was an early supporter of McGovern and wrote unflattering coverage of the rival campaigns in the increasingly widely read Rolling Stone.

Thompson went on to become a fierce critic of Nixon, both during and after his presidency. After Nixon's death in 1994, Thompson described him in Rolling Stone as a man who "could shake your hand and stab you in the back at the same time", and said "his casket [should] have been launched into one of those open-sewage canals that empty into the ocean just south of Los Angeles. He was a swine of a man and a jabbering dupe of a president. [He] was an evil man—evil in a way that only those who believe in the physical reality of the Devil can understand it." Following Nixon's pardon by Gerald Ford in 1974, Hunter ruminated on the roughly $400,000 pension Nixon maneuvered his way into, by resigning before being formally indicted. While The Washington Post was lamenting Nixon's "lonely and depressed" state after being forced from the White House, Hunter wrote that '[i]f there were any such thing as true justice in this world, his [Nixon's] rancid carcass would be somewhere down around Easter Island right now, in the belly of a hammerhead shark.' There was however one passion shared by Thompson and Nixon: a love of football, discussed in Fear and Loathing on the Campaign Trail '72.

Fame and its consequences
Thompson's journalistic work began to seriously suffer after his trip to Africa to cover the Rumble in the Jungle—the world heavyweight boxing match between George Foreman and Muhammad Ali—in 1974. He missed the match while intoxicated at his hotel, and did not submit a story to the magazine. As Wenner put it to the film critic Roger Ebert in the 2008 documentary Gonzo: The Life and Work of Dr. Hunter S. Thompson, "After Africa, he just couldn't write. He couldn't piece it together".

Plans for Thompson to cover the 1976 presidential campaign for Rolling Stone and later publish a book fell through after Wenner canceled the project without informing Thompson. Wenner then assigned Thompson to travel to Vietnam to cover what appeared to be the end of the Vietnam War. Thompson arrived in Saigon just as South Vietnam was collapsing and as other journalists were leaving the country. Wenner allegedly canceled Thompson's life insurance, which strained Thompson's relationship with Rolling Stone. He soon fled the country and refused to file his report until the ten-year anniversary of the Fall of Saigon.

From the late 1970s on, most of Thompson's literary output appeared as a four-volume series of books entitled The Gonzo Papers. Beginning with The Great Shark Hunt in 1979 and ending with Better Than Sex in 1994, the series is largely a collection of rare newspaper and magazine pieces from the pre-gonzo period, along with almost all of his Rolling Stone pieces.

Starting around 1980, Thompson became less active by his standards. Aside from paid appearances, he largely retreated to his compound in Woody Creek, rejecting projects and assignments or failing to complete them. Despite a lack of new material, Wenner kept Thompson on the Rolling Stone masthead as chief of the "National Affairs Desk", a position he held until his death.

In 1980, Thompson divorced his wife Sandra Conklin. The same year marked the release of Where the Buffalo Roam, a loose film adaptation based on Thompson's early 1970s work, starring Bill Murray as the writer. Murray eventually became one of Thompson's trusted friends. Later that year, Thompson relocated to Hawaii to research and write The Curse of Lono, a Gonzo-style account of the 1980 Honolulu Marathon. Extensively illustrated by Ralph Steadman, the piece first appeared in Running in 1981 as "The Charge of the Weird Brigade" and was later excerpted in Playboy in 1983.

In 1983, he covered the U.S. invasion of Grenada, but did not write or discuss the experiences until the publication of Kingdom of Fear in 2003. Later that year, at the behest of Terry McDonell, he wrote "A Dog Took My Place", an exposé for Rolling Stone of the scandalous Roxanne Pulitzer divorce case and what he called the "Palm Beach lifestyle". The story included dubious insinuations of bestiality, but was widely considered to be a return by Thompson to his proper form. In 1985, Thompson accepted an advance to write about "couples pornography" for Playboy. As part of his research, he spent evenings at the Mitchell Brothers O'Farrell Theatre striptease club in San Francisco. The experience evolved into an as-yet-unpublished novel tentatively entitled The Night Manager.

Thompson next accepted a role as weekly media columnist and critic for The San Francisco Examiner. The position was arranged by former editor and fellow Examiner columnist Warren Hinckle. His editor at The Examiner, David McCumber described, "One week it would be acid-soaked gibberish with a charm of its own. The next week it would be incisive political analysis of the highest order."

Many of these columns were collected in Gonzo Papers, Vol. 2: Generation of Swine: Tales of Shame and Degradation in the '80s (1988) and Gonzo Papers, Vol. 3: Songs of the Doomed: More Notes on the Death of the American Dream (1990), a collection of autobiographical reminiscences, articles, and previously unpublished material.

Later years
Thompson faced a sexual assault charge in March 1990 when former pornographic film director Gail Palmer claimed that after she denied his sexual advances while at his home, Thompson threw a drink at her and twisted her left breast. He was tried for five felonies and three misdemeanors owing to the assault charge and allegations of drug abuse after the police raided his home. The charges were dropped in May 1990.

Throughout the early 1990s, Thompson claimed to be at work on a novel entitled Polo Is My Life. It was briefly excerpted in Rolling Stone in 1994, and Thompson himself described it in 1996 as "a sex book — you know, sex, drugs, and rock and roll. It's about the manager of a sex theater who's forced to leave and flee to the mountains. He falls in love and gets in even more trouble than he was in the sex theater in San Francisco". The novel was slated to be released by Random House in 1999, and was even assigned , but was never published.

Thompson continued to publish irregularly in Rolling Stone, ultimately contributing 17 pieces to the magazine between 1984 and 2004. "Fear and Loathing in Elko," published in 1992, was a well-received fictional rallying cry against the nomination of Clarence Thomas to a seat on the Supreme Court of the United States. "Trapped in Mr. Bill's Neighborhood" was a largely factual account of an interview with Bill Clinton at a Little Rock, Arkansas, steakhouse. Rather than traveling the campaign trail as he had done in previous presidential elections, Thompson monitored the proceedings on cable television; Better Than Sex: Confessions of a Political Junkie, his account of the 1992 presidential campaign, is composed of reactive faxes to Rolling Stone. In 1994, the magazine published "He Was a Crook", a "scathing" obituary of Richard Nixon.

In November 2004, Rolling Stone published Thompson's final magazine feature "The Fun-Hogs in the Passing Lane: Fear and Loathing, Campaign 2004", a brief account of the 2004 presidential election in which he compared the outcome of the Bush v. Gore court case to the Reichstag fire and formally endorsed Senator John Kerry, a longtime friend, for president.

Fear and Loathing redux
In 1996, Modern Library reissued Fear and Loathing in Las Vegas along with "Strange Rumblings in Aztlan," "The Kentucky Derby Is Decadent and Depraved," and "Jacket Copy for Fear and Loathing in Las Vegas." Two years later, the film Fear and Loathing in Las Vegas generated new interest in Thompson and his work, and a paperback edition was published as a tie-in. The same year, an early novel, The Rum Diary, was published. Two volumes of collected letters also appeared during this time. 
 
Thompson's next, and penultimate, collection, Kingdom of Fear: Loathsome Secrets of a Star-Crossed Child in the Final Days of the American Century, was widely publicized as Thompson's first memoir. Published in 2003, it combined new material (including reminiscences of the O'Farrell Theater), selected newspaper and digital clippings, and other older works.

Thompson finished his journalism career in the same way it had begun: Writing about sports. From 2000 until his death in 2005, he wrote a weekly column for ESPN.com's Page 2 entitled "Hey, Rube." In 2004, Simon & Schuster collected some of the columns from the first few years and released them in mid-2004 as Hey Rube: Blood Sport, the Bush Doctrine, and the Downward Spiral of Dumbness.

Thompson married assistant Anita Bejmuk on April 23, 2003.

Death
At 5:42 pm on February 20, 2005, Thompson died from a self-inflicted gunshot wound to the head at Owl Farm, his "fortified compound" in Woody Creek, Colorado. His son Juan, daughter-in-law Jennifer, and grandson were visiting for the weekend. His wife Anita, who was at the Aspen Club, was on the phone with him as he cocked the gun. According to the Aspen Daily News, Thompson asked her to come home to help him write his ESPN column, then set the receiver on the counter. Anita said she mistook the cocking of the gun for the sound of his typewriter keys and hung up as he fired. Will and Jennifer were in the next room when they heard the gunshot, but mistook the sound for a book falling and did not check on Thompson immediately. Juan Thompson found his father's body. According to the police report and Anita's cell phone records, he called the sheriff's office half an hour later, then walked outside and fired three shotgun blasts into the air to "mark the passing of his father." The police report stated that in Thompson's typewriter was a piece of paper with the date "Feb. 22 '05" and a single word, "counselor."

Years of alcohol and cocaine abuse contributed to his problem with depression. Thompson's inner circle told the press that he had been depressed and always found February a "gloomy" month, with football season over and the harsh Colorado winter weather. He was also upset over his advancing age and chronic medical problems, including a hip replacement; he would frequently mutter "This kid is getting old." Rolling Stone published what Douglas Brinkley described as a suicide note written by Thompson to his wife, titled "Football Season Is Over." It read:

Thompson's collaborator and friend Ralph Steadman wrote:

Funeral
On August 20, 2005, in a private funeral, Thompson's ashes were fired from a cannon. This was accompanied by red, white, blue, and green fireworks—all to the tune of Norman Greenbaum's "Spirit in the Sky" and Bob Dylan's "Mr. Tambourine Man". The cannon was placed atop a  tower which had the shape of a double-thumbed fist clutching a peyote button, a symbol originally used in his 1970 campaign for sheriff of Pitkin County, Colorado. The plans for the monument were initially drawn by Thompson and Steadman, and were shown as part of an Omnibus program on the BBC titled Fear and Loathing in Gonzovision (1978). It is included as a special feature on the second disc of the 2004 Criterion Collection DVD release of Fear and Loathing in Las Vegas, and labeled as Fear and Loathing on the Road to Hollywood.
According to his widow, Anita, the $3 million funeral was funded by actor Johnny Depp, who was a close friend of Thompson's. Depp told the Associated Press, "All I'm doing is trying to make sure his last wish comes true. I just want to send my pal out the way he wants to go out." An estimated 280 people attended, including U.S. Senators John Kerry and George McGovern; 60 Minutes correspondents Ed Bradley and Charlie Rose; actors Jack Nicholson, John Cusack, Bill Murray, Benicio del Toro, Sean Penn, and Josh Hartnett; musicians Lyle Lovett, John Oates and David Amram, and artist and long-time friend Ralph Steadman.

Legacy

Writing style

Thompson is often credited as the creator of Gonzo journalism, a style of writing that blurs distinctions between fiction and nonfiction. His work and style are considered to be a major part of the New Journalism literary movement of the 1960s and 1970s, which attempted to break free from the purely objective style of mainstream reportage of the time. Thompson almost always wrote in the first person, while extensively using his own experiences and emotions to color "the story" he was trying to follow.

Despite him having personally described his work as "Gonzo", it fell to later observers to articulate what the term actually meant. While Thompson's approach clearly involved injecting himself as a participant in the events of the narrative, it also involved adding invented, metaphoric elements, thus creating, for the uninitiated reader, a seemingly confusing amalgam of facts and fiction notable for the deliberately blurred lines between one and the other. Thompson, in a 1974 interview in Playboy addressed the issue himself, saying, "Unlike Tom Wolfe or Gay Talese, I almost never try to reconstruct a story. They're both much better reporters than I am, but then, I don't think of myself as a reporter." Tom Wolfe would later describe Thompson's style as "... part journalism and part personal memoir admixed with powers of wild invention and wilder rhetoric." Or as one description of the differences between Thompson and Wolfe's styles would elaborate, "While Tom Wolfe mastered the technique of being a fly on the wall, Thompson mastered the art of being a fly in the ointment."

The majority of Thompson's most popular and acclaimed work appeared within the pages of Rolling Stone magazine. Along with Joe Eszterhas and David Felton, Thompson was instrumental in expanding the focus of the magazine past music criticism; indeed, Thompson was the only staff writer of the epoch never to contribute a music feature to the magazine. Nevertheless, his articles were always peppered with a wide array of pop music references ranging from Howlin' Wolf to Lou Reed. Armed with early fax machines wherever he went, he became notorious for haphazardly sending sometimes illegible material to the magazine's San Francisco offices as an issue was about to go to press.

Robert Love, Thompson's editor of 23 years at Rolling Stone, wrote, "the dividing line between fact and fancy rarely blurred, and we didn't always use italics or some other typographical device to indicate the lurch into the fabulous. But if there were living, identifiable humans in a scene, we took certain steps ... Hunter was a close friend of many prominent Democrats, veterans of the ten or more presidential campaigns he covered, so when in doubt, we'd call the press secretary. 'People will believe almost any twisted kind of story about politicians or Washington,' he once said, and he was right."

Discerning the line between the fact and the fiction of Thompson's work presented a practical problem for editors and fact-checkers of his work. Love called fact-checking Thompson's work "one of the sketchiest occupations ever created in the publishing world", and "for the first-timer ... a trip through a journalistic fun house, where you didn't know what was real and what wasn't. You knew you had better learn enough about the subject at hand to know when the riff began and reality ended. Hunter was a stickler for numbers, for details like gross weight and model numbers, for lyrics and caliber, and there was no faking it."

Persona

Thompson often used a blend of fiction and fact when portraying himself in his writing, too, sometimes using the name Raoul Duke as an author surrogate whom he generally described as a callous, erratic, self-destructive journalist who constantly drank alcohol and took hallucinogenic drugs. Fantasizing about causing bodily harm to others was also a characteristic in his work used to comedic effect and an example of his brand of humor.

In the late 1960s, Thompson acquired the title of "Doctor" from the Universal Life Church.

A number of critics have commented that as he grew older, the line that distinguished Thompson from his literary self became increasingly blurred. Thompson admitted during a 1978 BBC interview that he sometimes felt pressured to live up to the fictional self that he had created, adding, "I'm never sure which one people expect me to be. Very often, they conflict — most often, as a matter of fact. ... I'm leading a normal life and right alongside me there is this myth, and it is growing and mushrooming and getting more and more warped. When I get invited to, say, speak at universities, I'm not sure if they are inviting Duke or Thompson. I'm not sure who to be."

Thompson's writing style and eccentric persona gave him a cult following in both literary and drug circles, and his cult status expanded into broader areas after being portrayed three times in major motion pictures. Hence, both his writing style and persona have been widely imitated, and his likeness has even become a popular costume choice for Halloween.

Political beliefs
Thompson was a firearms and explosives enthusiast (in his writing and in life) and owned a vast collection of handguns, rifles, shotguns, and various automatic and semiautomatic weapons, along with numerous forms of gaseous crowd-control and many homemade devices. He was a proponent of the right to bear arms and privacy rights. A member of the National Rifle Association, Thompson was also co-creator of the Fourth Amendment Foundation, an organization to assist victims in defending themselves against unwarranted search and seizure.

Part of his work with the Fourth Amendment Foundation centered around support of Lisl Auman, a Colorado woman who was sentenced for life in 1997 under felony murder charges for the death of police officer Bruce VanderJagt, despite contradictory statements and dubious evidence. Thompson organized rallies, provided legal support, and co-wrote an article in the June 2004 issue of Vanity Fair outlining the case. The Colorado Supreme Court eventually overturned Auman's sentence in March 2005, shortly after Thompson's death, and Auman is now free. Auman's supporters claim Thompson's support and publicity resulted in the successful appeal.

Thompson was also an ardent supporter of drug legalization and became known for his detailed accounts of his own drug use. He was an early supporter of the National Organization for the Reform of Marijuana Laws and served on the group's advisory board for over 30 years, until his death. He told an interviewer in 1997 that drugs should be legalized "[a]cross the board. It might be a little rough on some people for a while, but I think it's the only way to deal with drugs. Look at Prohibition; all it did was make a lot of criminals rich."

In a 1965 letter to his friend Paul Semonin, Thompson explained an affection for the Industrial Workers of the World, "I have in recent months come to have a certain feeling for Joe Hill and the Wobbly crowd who, if nothing else, had the right idea. But not the right mechanics. I believe the IWW was probably the last human concept in American politics." In another letter to Semonin, Thompson wrote that he agreed with Karl Marx, and compared him to Thomas Jefferson. In a letter to William Kennedy, Thompson confided that he was "coming to view the free enterprise system as the single greatest evil in the history of human savagery." In the documentary Breakfast with Hunter, Hunter S. Thompson is seen in several scenes wearing different Che Guevara T-shirts. Additionally, actor and friend Benicio del Toro has stated that Thompson kept a "big" picture of Che in his kitchen. Thompson wrote on behalf of African-American rights and the civil rights movement. He strongly criticized the dominance in American society of what he called "white power structures".

After the September 11 attacks, Thompson voiced skepticism regarding the official story on who was responsible for the attacks. He speculated to several interviewers that it had been conducted by the U.S. government or with the government's assistance, though readily admitting he had no way to prove his theory.

In 2004, Thompson wrote: "[Richard] Nixon was a professional politician, and I despised everything he stood for—but if he were running for president this year against the evil Bush–Cheney gang, I would happily vote for him."

Scholarships 
Thompson's widow established two scholarship funds at Columbia University School of General Studies for U.S. military veterans and the University of Kentucky for journalism students.
Colorado NORML created the Hunter S. Thompson Scholarship to pay all expenses for a lawyer or law student to attend the NORML Legal Committee Conference in Aspen, generally the first few days of June each year. The funding from a silent auction has paid for two winners for some years. Many winners have gone on to become important cannabis lawyers on state and national levels.

Works

Books
Thompson published books from 1966 to the end of his life. His best-known works include Hell's Angels: The Strange and Terrible Saga of the Outlaw Motorcycle Gangs, Fear and Loathing in Las Vegas, The Rum Diary, The Curse of Lono, and Screwjack.

Articles
As a journalist over the course of decades, Thompson published numerous articles in various periodicals. He wrote for many publications, including Rolling Stone, Esquire, The Boston Globe, Chicago Tribune, The New York Times, The San Francisco Examiner, Time, Vanity Fair, The San Juan Star, and Playboy. He was also guest editor for a single edition of The Aspen Daily News. A collection of 100 of his columns from The San Francisco Examiner was published in 1988 as Gonzo Papers, Vol. 2: Generation of Swine: Tales of Shame and Degradation in the '80s. A collection of his articles for Rolling Stone was released in 2011 as Fear and Loathing at Rolling Stone: The Essential Writings of Hunter S. Thompson. The book was edited by the magazine's co-founder and publisher, Jann S. Wenner, who also provided an introduction to the collection.

Letters
Thompson wrote many letters, which were his primary means of personal communication. He made carbon copies of all his letters, usually typed, a habit begun in his teenaged years.

The Fear and Loathing Letters is a three-volume collection of selections from Thompson's correspondence, edited by historian Douglas Brinkley. The first volume, The Proud Highway, was published in 1997, and contains letters from 1955 to 1967. Fear and Loathing in America was published in 2000 and contains letters dating from 1968 to 1976. A third volume, titled The Mutineer: Rants, Ravings, and Missives from the Mountaintop 1977–2005, was edited by Douglas Brinkley and prepared by Simon & Schuster in 2005. As of March 2019, it has yet to be sold to the public. It contains a special introduction by Johnny Depp.

Illustrations
Accompanying the eccentric and colorful writing of Hunter Thompson, illustrations by British artist Ralph Steadman offer visual representations of the Gonzo style. Steadman and Thompson developed a professional relationship. The two collaborated many times over Thompson's career, although at times they were known to argue violently. Wayne Ewing's documentary on Hunter captured an encounter where Steadman tells Hunter that he believes his drawings contributed as much to the success of Fear and Loathing in Las Vegas as Hunter's writing. Hunter was furious at the suggestion and their relationship was certainly, at times, strained. Steadman in recent years has described Hunter as "rude" and  "a bully." So while they are publicly known as great friends, the true nature of their relationship was considerably more nuanced.

Photography
Thompson was an avid amateur photographer throughout his life, and his photos have been exhibited since his death at art galleries in the United States and United Kingdom. In late 2006, AMMO Books published a limited-edition, 224-page collection of Thompson photos called Gonzo: Photographs by Hunter S. Thompson, with an introduction by Johnny Depp. Thompson's snapshots were a combination of the subjects he was covering, stylized self-portraits, and artistic still life photos. The London Observer called the photos "astonishingly good" and noted that "Thompson's pictures remind us, brilliantly in every sense, of very real people, real colours."

Feature films

The film Where the Buffalo Roam (1980) depicts heavily fictionalized attempts by Thompson to cover the Super Bowl and the 1972 U.S. presidential election. It stars Bill Murray as Thompson and Peter Boyle as Thompson's attorney Oscar Zeta Acosta, referred to in the movie as Carl Lazlo, Esq.

The 1998 film adaptation of Fear and Loathing in Las Vegas was directed by Monty Python veteran Terry Gilliam and starred Johnny Depp (who moved into Thompson's basement to "study" Thompson's persona before assuming his role in the film) as Raoul Duke and Benicio del Toro as Oscar Zeta Acosta. The film has achieved something of a cult following.

In the 2001 film Ali, Thompson is briefly portrayed by actor Lee Cummings.

The film adaptation of Thompson's novel The Rum Diary was released in October 2011, also starring Johnny Depp as the main character, Paul Kemp. The novel's premise was inspired by Thompson's own experiences in Puerto Rico. The film was written and directed by Bruce Robinson.

At a press junket for The Rum Diary shortly before the film's release, Depp said that he would like to adapt The Curse of Lono, "The Kentucky Derby Is Decadent and Depraved", and Hell's Angels: The Strange and Terrible Saga of the Outlaw Motorcycle Gangs for the big screen: "I'd just keep playing Hunter. There's a great comfort in it for me, because I get a great visit with my old friend who I miss dearly."

Documentaries
Fear and Loathing in Gonzovision (1978) is an extended television profile by the BBC. It can be found on disc 2 of The Criterion Collection edition of Fear and Loathing in Las Vegas.

The Mitchell brothers, owners of the O'Farrell Theatre in San Francisco, made a documentary about Thompson in 1988 called Hunter S. Thompson: The Crazy Never Die.

Wayne Ewing created three documentaries about Thompson. The film Breakfast with Hunter (2003) was directed and edited by Ewing. It documents Thompson's work on the movie Fear and Loathing in Las Vegas, his arrest for drunk driving, and his subsequent fight with the court system. When I Die (2005) is a video chronicle of making Thompson's final farewell wishes a reality, and documents the send-off itself. Free Lisl: Fear and Loathing in Denver (2006) chronicles Thompson's efforts in helping to free Lisl Auman, who was sentenced to life in prison without parole for the shooting of a police officer, a crime she did not commit. All three films are only available online.

In Come on Down: Searching for the American Dream (2004) Thompson gives director Adamm Liley insight into the nature of the American Dream over drinks at the Woody Creek Tavern.

Buy the Ticket, Take the Ride: Hunter S. Thompson on Film (2006) was directed by Tom Thurman, written by Tom Marksbury, and produced by the Starz Entertainment Group. The original documentary features interviews with Thompson's inner circle of family and friends, but the thrust of the film focuses on the manner in which his life often overlapped with numerous Hollywood celebrities who became his close friends, such as Johnny Depp, Benicio del Toro, Bill Murray, Sean Penn, John Cusack, Thompson's wife Anita, son Juan, former Senators George McGovern and Gary Hart, writers Tom Wolfe and William F. Buckley, actors Gary Busey and Harry Dean Stanton, and the illustrator Ralph Steadman among others.

Blasted!!! The Gonzo Patriots of Hunter S. Thompson (2006), produced, directed, photographed, and edited by Blue Kraning, is a documentary about the scores of fans who volunteered their privately owned artillery to fire the ashes of Thompson. Blasted!!! premiered at the 2006 Starz Denver International Film Festival, part of a tribute series to Thompson held at the Denver Press Club.

In 2008, Academy Award-winning documentarian Alex Gibney (Enron: The Smartest Guys in the Room, Taxi to the Dark Side) wrote and directed a documentary on Thompson, titled Gonzo: The Life and Work of Dr. Hunter S. Thompson. The film premiered on January 20, 2008, at the Sundance Film Festival. Gibney uses intimate, never-before-seen home videos, interviews with friends, enemies, lovers, and clips from films adapted from Thompson's material to document his turbulent life.

Theater
Lou Stein's adaptation of Fear and Loathing in Las Vegas was performed at the Battersea Theatre. Stein persuades London's Time Out magazine to put Thompson up for a fortnight, in exchange for him writing a cover story to publicize the play. Thompson does not write the story, but does rampage around London on Time Outs expense account. The play was revived for the Vault Fringe Festival in 2014.

GONZO: A Brutal Chrysalis is a one-man show about Thompson written by Paul Addis, who also played the author. Set in the writing den of Thompson's Woody Creek home, the show portrays his life between 1968 and 1971. James Cartee began playing the role soon after Addis's arrest in 2009, and again after Addis's death in 2012.

Awards, accolades, and tributes
 Thompson was named a Kentucky Colonel by the governor of Kentucky in a December 1996 tribute ceremony where he also received keys to the city of Louisville.
 Author Tom Wolfe has called Thompson the greatest American comic writer of the 20th century.
 Asked in an interview with Jody Denberg on KGSR Studio, in 2000, whether he would ever consider writing a book "like [his] buddy Hunter S. Thompson", the musician Warren Zevon responded: "Let's remember that Hunter S. Thompson is the finest writer of our generation; he didn't just toss off a book the other day..."
 Thompson appeared on the cover of the 1,000th issue of Rolling Stone, May 18 – June 1, 2006, as a devil playing the guitar next to the two "L"'s in the word "Rolling". Johnny Depp also appeared on the cover.
 The Thompson-inspired character Uncle Duke appears on a recurring basis in Doonesbury, the daily newspaper comic strip by Garry Trudeau. When the character was first introduced, Thompson protested, quoted in an interview as saying that he would set Trudeau on fire if the two ever met, although reportedly he liked the character in later years. Between March 7, 2005 (roughly two weeks after Thompson's suicide), and March 12, 2005, Doonesbury ran a tribute to Hunter, with Uncle Duke lamenting the death of the man he called his "inspiration". The first of these strips featured a panel with artwork similar to that of Ralph Steadman, and later strips featured various non sequiturs (with Duke variously transforming into a monster, melting, shrinking to the size of an empty drinking glass, or people around him turning into animals), which seemed to mirror some of the effects of hallucinogenic drugs described in Fear and Loathing in Las Vegas.
 Many have suggested that General Hunter Gathers in the Adult Swim animated series The Venture Bros. is a tribute to Thompson, as they have a similar name, mannerisms, and physical appearance.
 Dale Gribble in the Fox animated series King of the Hill is a tribute to Thompson and derives his physical appearance from him.
In the Cameron Crowe film Almost Famous, based on Crowe's experiences writing for Rolling Stone while on the road with the fictional band Stillwater", the writer is on the phone with an actor portraying Jann Wenner.  Wenner tells the young journalist that he "is not there to join the party, we already have one Hunter Thompson" after the young writer amassed large hotel and traveling expenses and is overheard to be sharing his room with several young women.
Eric C. Shoaf donated a caché of approximately 800 items (in librarian terms, about 35-40 linear feet of material on a shelf) pertaining to the life and career of Thompson to the University of California at Santa Cruz.  Shoaf also published a descriptive bibliography, Gonzology: A Hunter Thompson Bibliography, of the works of Hunter S. Thompson with over 1,000 entries, many never before documented appearances in print, hundreds of biographical entries about Thompson's life, full descriptions of all his primary works, preface by William McKeen, Phd, and photo section with rare and exclusive items depicted.

References

External links

 
 
 
 Hunter S. Thompson – photography selection
 
 "Hunter S. Thompson's ESPN Page 2 Archive", Totallygonzo.org
 "Shotgun Golf With Bill Murray", Thompson's final column for ESPN.com's Page 2.
 A collection of articles on Thompson from The Guardian
 Wills, David S., High White Notes: The Rise and Fall of Gonzo Journalism. Edinburgh: Beatdom Books, 2022. ISBN  978-0-9934099-8-1
 
 
 

 
1937 births
2005 suicides
20th-century American journalists
20th-century American male writers
20th-century American novelists
20th-century essayists
21st-century American journalists
21st-century American male writers
21st-century American novelists
9/11 conspiracy theorists
American activist journalists
American columnists
American conspiracy theorists
American essayists
American male essayists
American male journalists
American male novelists
American Marxists
American people of Scottish descent
American political writers
American tax resisters
Atherton High School alumni
Columbia University School of General Studies alumni
American psychedelic drug advocates
Florida State University alumni
Journalists from Colorado
Journalists from Kentucky
Louisville Male High School alumni
Military personnel from Louisville, Kentucky
Motorcycling writers
Novelists from Colorado
Novelists from Kentucky
People from Glen Ellen, California
Sportswriters from California
Suicides by firearm in Colorado
United States Air Force airmen
Writers from Louisville, Kentucky